The Ščavnica (German: Stainz) is a  river in Styria, Slovenia. It sources near Zgornja Velka and flows along the Slovene Hills towards the southeast. It passes Negova Castle and Sveti Jurij ob Ščavnici, traverses Lake Gajševci and the town of Ljutomer, and finally joins the Mur from the right in Razkrižje.

The Ščavnica is one of the most heavily polluted rivers in Slovenia.

References

External links

 Condition of Ščavnica - graphs, in the following order, of water level, flow and temperature data for the past 30 days (taken in Pristava by ARSO)

Rivers of Styria (Slovenia)